The English name gooseberry sawfly refers to at least three species of sawfly:

Nematus ribesii, the common gooseberry sawfly or imported currentworm
Nematus leucotrochus, the pale-spotted gooseberry sawfly
Pristiphora appendiculata, the small gooseberry sawfly

References

Set index articles on animal common names